The discography of Smash Mouth, an American rock band, consists of seven studio albums, four compilation albums, 19 singles and 13 music videos. Their first studio album, Fush Yu Mang, was released in 1997. It peaked at number 19 in the US and was certified platinum two times by the RIAA. A single from the album, "Walkin' on the Sun", peaked at number 1 on the US Adult Top 40 and Alternative Songs charts and at number 3 in Canada. In 1999, Smash Mouth released their second studio album, Astro Lounge. Helped by the singles "Can't Get Enough of You Baby", "All Star", and "Then the Morning Comes", the album peaked at number 6 in the US and was certified platinum three times by the RIAA. "All Star" peaked at number 1 on the US Adult Top 40 chart and also reached the top five on the US Billboard Hot 100, US Alternative Songs, Australia, and Canada charts. "Then the Morning Comes" peaked at number 2 on the US Adult Top 40 and Canada charts.

The band released their self-titled third studio album in 2001. It peaked at number 48 in the US and was certified gold by the RIAA; to date, it is their third and last album to be certified by the RIAA. The single "I'm a Believer" is the last Smash Mouth song to reach the top five of a chart, peaking at number 4 on the US Adult Top 40. Both "All Star" and "I'm a Believer" were featured on the soundtrack for the 2001 film Shrek. Smash Mouth's next studio album, Get the Picture?, was released in 2003. It is their last studio album to chart in the US. In 2005, they released the compilation album All Star Smash Hits and the studio album The Gift of Rock. All Star Smash Hits is their only compilation album to chart in the US. The following year, the band released the studio album Summer Girl. They then released their latest studio album, Magic, in 2012.

Albums

Studio albums

Compilation albums

Singles

Music videos

Notes

A  "Walkin' on the Sun" did not enter the Billboard Hot 100, but peaked at number 2 on the Hot 100 Airplay chart.
B  "Can't Get Enough of You, Baby" did not enter the Billboard Hot 100, but peaked at number 27 on the Hot 100 Airplay chart.
C  "Pacific Coast Party" did not enter the Billboard Hot 100, but peaked at number 14 on the Bubbling Under Hot 100 Singles chart, which acts as a 25-song extension to the Hot 100.

References

External links
 Official website
 Smash Mouth at AllMusic
 
 

Discographies of American artists
Rock music group discographies
Discography